The Vinnytsia water tower is a landmark of the city of Vinnytsia, Ukraine, constructed in 1912 and located on European Square. It has served as a museum since 1985 and was listed as a cultural monument of local importance on February 17, 1983.

The tower was built in 1912, when the water pipe system was laid out in Vinnytsia. The tower doubled as a fire observation point. The architect was Grigory Artynov. The water was taken from the Southern Bug River and then distributed around the city center.

In 1920, the building stopped functioning as a water tower. During World War II it served as an observation tower, and after the war, it was converted into a residence. In 1985, it was transferred to Vinnytsia Regional Museum. First, it hosted an exposition on the history of the October Revolution and World War II. In 1993, an exposition devoted to the Soviet–Afghan War was added.

It is made of brick.

References

Buildings and structures in Vinnytsia
Buildings and structures completed in 1912
Water towers in Ukraine
1912 establishments in Ukraine
1912 establishments in the Russian Empire